Robert II may refer to:

Robert II, Count of Worms (770–807)
Robert II of France (972–1031)
Robert Curthose, Duke of Normandy (c. 1051 – 1134) also known as Robert II
Robert II de Brus (fl. 1138, died ca. 1189 or 1194)
Robert II de la Marck (1468–1536)
Robert II of Dreux (1154–1218)
Robert II of Scotland (1316–1390), known as "The Steward"
Robert II of Flanders (1065–1111), known as "Robert of Jerusalem"
Robert II, Count of Artois (1250–1302)
Robert II, Duke of Burgundy (1248–1306)